Ángel Maldonado Campos (17 November 1927 – 10 February 2018) was a Mexican swimmer. He competed in two events at the 1948 Summer Olympics.

References

1927 births
2018 deaths
Mexican male swimmers
Olympic swimmers of Mexico
Swimmers at the 1948 Summer Olympics
Place of birth missing